Environmental Monitoring and Assessment, first published in 1981, is a weekly, peer reviewed, scientific journal published by Springer. The managing editor is G.B. Wiersma (University of Maine).

Aims and scope

Data analysis
The focus of this journal is the results of analyzed data pertaining to assessment and monitoring of risks that may affect the environment and human beings. The analysis is also synthesised with various categories of health data. The data gathered from the studies of diseases in human populations (risk factors and remedies), and toxicological ramifications obtained from the data analysis is published as well. Coverage includes, the steps and process of assessing risks from exposure to pollution.

Systems monitoring
Coverage includes environmental systems monitoring from conception to configuration, implementation, and management. These monitoring systems are designed to gather data pertaining to individuals and populations.

Broad topical coverage
In general,  environmental management, ecology, environmental toxicology, pollution remediation, along with environmental monitoring and analysis are related subjects.

Abstracting and indexing
This journal is indexed in the following databases.
AGRICOLA
Science Citation Index Expanded
Current Contents/Agriculture, Biology & Environmental Sciences
The Zoological Record
BIOSIS Previews
Chemical Abstracts Service
Scopus
Index Medicus
MEDLINE
PubMed
CAB Abstracts
Global Health
CAB International
Geobase
Compendex
International Bibliography of Periodical Literature
Food Science and Technology Abstracts

See also
Radiation monitoring
Environmental monitoring
Strategic Environmental Assessment
Institute for Environment and Sustainability

References

Springer Science+Business Media academic journals
Publications established in 1981
Weekly journals
English-language journals
Waste management journals